The Boston College Eagles represented Boston College in Hockey East women's ice hockey. The Eagles will attempt to win the NCAA tournament for the first time in school history.

Offseason
August 21: Blake Bolden was appointed team captain while Meagan Mangene was named assistant captain for the season.

Recruiting

Regular season

Standings

Schedule

Conference record

Roster

Awards and honors
Emily Field, Runner-Up, Hockey East Player of the Month (Month of December 2012) 
Corinne Boyles, Runner-Up, Hockey East Goaltender of the Month (Month of December 2012)

References

Boston College Eagles women's ice hockey seasons
2012–13 NCAA Division I women's hockey season
Boston College Eagles women's ice hockey season
Boston College Eagles women's ice hockey season
Boston College Eagles women's ice hockey season
Boston College Eagles women's ice hockey season